Tachina brevicornis is a species of fly in the genus Tachina of the family Tachinidae that can be found in China, Japan, and Russia.

References

Insects described in 1929
Diptera of Asia
breviceps